Dinitromethane is an organic compound with the chemical formula CH2(NO2)2. Purified dinitromethane is a colorless liquid with a weak pleasant odor. It is relatively stable at room temperature and can be safely stored for months at 0 °C.

Synthesis
The potassium salt of dinitromethanide, KCH(NO2)2, was first prepared by Villiers in 1884 by reduction of bromodinitromethane.  Hydrogen fluoride and the potassium salt of dinitromethane react in diethyl ether to form dinitromethane.  Free dinitromethane was previously understood to be a pale, yellow oil that decomposed rapidly at ambient temperatures.

Dinitromethane should not be confused with methylene dinitrate (CH2(ONO2)2), which is produced as a byproduct in the production of the explosive RDX.

Safety
The transportation of dinitromethane is forbidden by the U.S. Department of Transportation.

References

Related
 Nitromethane
 Trinitromethane
 Tetranitromethane

Nitroalkanes